Frontella is a monotypic genus of Asian dwarf spiders containing the single species, Frontella pallida. It was first described by Władysław Kulczyński in 1908, and has only been found in Russia.

See also
 List of Linyphiidae species (A–H)

References

Linyphiidae
Monotypic Araneomorphae genera
Spiders of Russia